The Wenatchee Fire Station No. 1, at 136 S. Chelan Ave. in Wenatchee, Washington, was built in 1929.  It was listed on the National Register of Historic Places in 2004 as Wenatchee Fire Station #1.

It is significant as a work of architect Ludwig O. Solberg.  It includes a five-story tower, which serves both as a hose tower and as a firefighting training tower.

According to its NRHP nomination, "The building's symmetry and classical detailing play heavily upon the Beaux Arts styling, while the hose tower/practice tower owes it design influence to a Gothic church steeple."

References

Fire stations on the National Register of Historic Places in Washington (state)
National Register of Historic Places in Chelan County, Washington
Beaux-Arts architecture in Washington (state)
Buildings and structures completed in 1929